The Ford FX-Atmos was a concept car built by the Ford Motor Company for the 1954 Chicago Auto Show. According to one source, it was considered as a candidate for a nuclear power plant. 

It was styled after jet aircraft, with headlight/ front fender pods mounting radio antennas and bearing a strong resemblance to ramjet air intakes; it also had rocket exhaust styled taillights, and prominent tail fins. The cabin set the driver on the centerline and provided two rear seats, all under a clear dome. The driver's controls and instruments were also futuristic, with dual handgrips instead of a steering wheel and a screen on the dash-intended to display radar sourced highway information.

It has been suggested that the FX-Atmos was a significant inspiration in the design of Supercar in the  Gerry Anderson TV series of that name.

References 

Ford concept vehicles